dDamage is a French electronic music duo from Paris, composed of brothers Frédéric and Jean-Baptiste Hanak. dDamage released 8 albums, several singles, EPs and soundtracks, over a period of 20 years.

Career 
Their first album, "Reverbreak This Beat Down" was released on Swiss label grafted_ in 2000. Their early sound was a bold prototype of heavy Hip-Hop beats, ever-present under layers of samples, noise and ambient electronics. The following year, they put out "Harsh Reality of Daily Life " on Alice In Wonder, a sub-division of the Noise Museum label. Techno and industrial influences became more apparent, bringing a harder, harsher sound and attitude. In 2003, they joined forces with French Rap trio TTC and American rapper Dose One for an collaborative EP entitled "Trop Singe", and the main cut is featured on a compilation from French independent label Active Suspension.

They received more attention internationally in 2004, upon the release of their third album, "Radio Ape", on electronic pioneer Mike Paradinas' Planet Mu label (UK). A few months later, the "Pressure EP" was released (also on Planet Mu) and they began to reach a wider audience, worldwide... largely due to the label's notoriety and promotion work, Warp distribution as well as dDamage's live shows.

Regular collaborations with Japanese label 19-T soon followed, earning them a growing notoriety in the Japanese underground scene. Their love affair with Japan resulted in 4 live tours and an album on Japanese label P-Vine Records.

In 2006, they put out a collaborative EP, "Ink808" on American label Tigerbeat6, run by Kid606, featuring Parisian heavyweights Vicnet, Krikor and Krazy Baldhead. They tour in the United States and Canada. The same year, their fourth album "Shimmy Shimmy Blade" is released on French label Tsunami-Addiction, reflecting even more Hip-Hop influences in their production and sound... adding several MC's to the mix: Existereo, Tes, Bigg Jus (of Company Flow), MF Doom, Mike Ladd, Dose One, Orko Elohiem and TTC. It became a first big move towards more collaborative work, with artists  from different countries, scenes and backgrounds.

2007 marks the release of a second EP on Tigerbeat6 (their dancefloor division "Tigerbass"), a rowdy collection of tracks rounded out by a gritty cover of the Revolting Cocks.

The EP "Fuzzbox" was released in 2010 on French label Clapping-Music, featuring Bomb The Bass, Jon Spencer (Blues Explosion) and Jack Dangers (Meat Beat Manifesto). The same year, another heavily collaborative album "Aeroplanes" hits the shops. Released on French label Modulor and Japanese label P-Vine, the album features more guest appearances, from even broader horizons: rappers Young Jeezy, Don Bishop Agallah, Sin, Tes, Crunc Tesla, Radioinactive. Rock musicians Jon Spencer, Stuntman5, Angil as well as fellow electronic artists Christ (of Boards of Canada), Bomb The Bass, Krazy Baldhead, Raoul Sinier, Mochipet and Japanese pop-songstress Kumisolo round out the line-up.

2010 also saw dDamage returning to Japan for a second live tour, which culminated in a Japan-only release: "The Truth", on Murder Channel Records, an album featuring Magnum38, Kid606, Young Jeezy, Agallah, Sin, Tes...

In late 2011, the album "Brother In Death" is released on Tsunami-Addiction, with a heavy roster of guest artists, such as Techno veteran Black Devil Disco Club, Faris Badwan (The Horrors), Mondkopf, Maxx (The Goats), Shex and Miss Hawaï (both known for their releases on Rephlex Records). The brothers returned to Japan for further live shows, and the album was officially released in China on Shanshui Records.

dDamage composed their first film soundtrack, for French director Jill Coulon's film "Tu Seras Sumo". The film was a co-production between France and Japan, produced by Japanese Broadcasting Group NHK Television. The majority of compositions were penned by Jean-Baptiste, but the collection also includes dDamage tracks re-arranged by both Jb and Frédéric.

After 3 years of relative silence, the pair return in 2016 with another soundtrack for "The Open", a Franco-Belgian feature-length film directed by Marc Lahore. The same year, they proclaim their love for British Heavy Metal with an EP of Industrial cover versions of classic jams by some of the masters: Motörhead, Judas Priest, Iron Maiden and Black Sabbath.

After all of the eclectic collaborations they've instigated over the years, they felt that it was time to return to the source, the foundations of dDamage, the brothers Hanak themselves. Their last album was aptly titled "Brother vs. Brother", a final explosion of love, joy, anger, madness and passion, released on Bruit Blanc (Schubert Publishing) in 2019. The only exception to the rule would be Otto Von Shirach (on vocals), but, otherwise, "Brother vs Brother" is what it says: a result of the two minds meeting, clashing, melding and emoting, without outside interference. The album was finalized in 2018, and Frédéric died shortly afterwards. The album was released in 2019, and Jean-Baptiste, now solo, performed a few dDamage shows in France and Japan... before finally declaring the end of dDamage.

Discography

Albums
 2000: Reverbreak This Beat Down (Grafted)
 2001: Harsh Reality Of Daily Life (Alice in Wonder)
 2003: The Missing Link (Intikrec)
 2004: Radio Ape (Planet Mu)
 2006: Shimmy Shimmy Blade (Tsunami-Addiction)
 2010: Aeroplanes (Modulor / P-Vine)
 2011: Brother in Death (Tsunami-Addiction)
 2019: Brother VS Brother (Bruit Blanc)

EPs
 2003: Trop Singe (Clapping Music)
 2004: Pressure (Planet Mu)
 2006: Ink 808 (Tigerbeat6)
 2007: Shimmy Shimmy Blade Instrumentals (Tsunami-Addiction)
 2008: 100% Hate EP (Tigerbass)
 2010: The Truth (Murder Channel Records)
 2010: dDamage VS Bomb The Bass (Clapping Music)

Soundtracks
 2013: Shinbô (Tsunami-Addiction)

Compilations
 2016: Fat Rules (Tsunami-Addiction / Noisey)

References

French hip hop groups
Intelligent dance musicians
Planet Mu artists